Lourdes Chacón (born February 14, 1956) is a Puerto Rican actress, dancer, and singer.

Biography
Lourdes enjoyed huge popularity and media exposure during the 1980s and 1990s in the island of Puerto Rico. She was also popular in Mexico, where she was baptized under the name of "Piel de Fuego" (Skin on Fire). She is well known for her exotic dance performances and songs encompassing "El Ritmo, Fuego y Sabor" (Rhythm, Fire, and Flavor). She shares her surname with her half-sister Iris Chacón who is also a vedette.

Early life 
Born of parents Don Angel Manuel Chacón Alonso and Mother Carmen Rodriguez Ortiz in Cayey, Puerto Rico, raised in Chicago, IL, and by her late teens returned to reside in Barrio Maricao de Vega Alta, PR.

Career 
She became an internationally known artist in the 1980s. She was discovered and hired by the late Paquito Cordero, of (Paquito Cordero Productions, Inc), which aired local programs and Puerto Rican TV productions via Telemundo.

In the 80s she made weekly appearances in a musical comedy show called "The Kakukomicos". While filming that show, she was given the opportunity to showcase her voice in song. "Suavecito" was her first song on television. The song was written by the Puerto Rican salsero, Felito Felix. And even though the song was never put on an LP record. It was successful in the promoting Lourdes and helped in her artist development. Eventually she a recorded her "self" titled LP vinyl record and Another hit song was born called, " El Pescaito" (The Little Fish).

2017 Lourdes is still active vedette; acting, dancing and singing.

Personal life 
Lourdes retired in early 90s, she married Alfredo Batista on July 27, 1994, she has two children. She made a few acting roles and theater appearances during those years.  On May 1, 2010 she divorced due to irreconcilable differences.

In 2018, she made a comeback as a full time vedette and was dating trumpet player, Ismael Rosario.

Discography 
 Lourdes Chacón LP Recording (1983) 
 Felicidades CD Recording (1993)

Filmography
 Mili (Telenovela) (1984)
 La 1 a.m (movie) (2010)

Theatre
 (1984)
   (Venezuela Production) (1991)
   (1995)
   (1997)
   (1999)
  (2012)

Television
 Los Kakukomicos 1980– 1990

References

 Television Interview (circa 2005)

External links

Living people
20th-century Puerto Rican actresses
People from Cayey, Puerto Rico
Puerto Rican dancers
20th-century Puerto Rican women singers
Puerto Rican television personalities
1960 births